The Liguilla of the 2010 Primera División de México Apertura was a final knockout tournament involving eight teams of the Primera División de México. The tournament began on November 17, 2010 and concluded on December 5, 2010 with Monterrey beating Santos Laguna 5 – 3 on aggregate over two legs.

Teams
The 18 teams that participated in the 2010 Apertura were divided into three groups of six teams. The top two in each group qualify automatically. The two best teams in the general table not already qualified, regardless of group, qualify as well.

Bracket
The eight qualified teams play two games against each other on a home-and-away basis. The winner of each match up is determined by aggregate score.

The teams were seeded one to eight in quarterfinals, and will be re-seeded one to four in semifinals, depending on their position in the general table. The higher seeded teams play on their home field during the second leg.

 If the two teams are tied after both legs, the higher seeded team advances.
 Both finalist qualify to the 2011–12 CONCACAF Champions League. The champion qualifies directly to the group stage, while the runner-up qualifies to the preliminary round.

Quarter-finals
The first legs of the quarterfinals were played on November 17 and 18. The second legs were played on November 20 and 21.

Kickoffs are given in local time (UTC-6).

First leg

Second leg

Semi-finals
The first legs of the semifinals were played on November 25. The second legs were played on November 28.

Kickoffs are given in local time (UTC-6).

First leg

Second leg

Final
The first leg of the final was played on December 2. The second leg was played on December 5.

Kickoffs are given in local time (UTC-6).

First leg

Second leg

References